Malayodracon is a genus of lizard within the family Agamidae. The genus is monotypic, containing the sole species Malayodracon robinsonii. The species, also known commonly as Robinson's anglehead lizard and Robinson's forest dragon, is endemic to Southeast Asia. No subspecies are recognized as being valid.

Etymology
The specific name, robinsonii, is in honor of British ornithologist Herbert Christopher Robinson.

Geographic range
M. robinsonii is found in West Malaysia.

Habitat

Reproduction
M. robinsonii is oviparous.

References

Further reading
Boulenger GA (1908). "Report on the Gunong Tahan Expedition, May–September, 1905. III. Fishes, Batrachians and Reptiles". Journal of the Federated Malay States Museums 3: 61-69 + Plates IV-V. (Gonyocephalus robinsonii, new species, pp. 65-66 + Plate V).
Denzer, Wolfgang; Manthey, Ulrich; Mahlow, Kristin; Böhme, Wolfgang (2015). "The systematic status of Gonocephalus robinsonii Boulenger, 1908 (Squamata: Agamidae: Draconinae)". Zootaxa 4039 (1): 129–144. (Malayodracon, new genus; M. robinsonii, new combination).
Manthey, Ulrich; Denzer, Wolfgang (1992). "Die Echten Winkelkopfagamen der Gattung Gonocephalus Kaup (Sauria: Agamidae). IV. Gonocephalus mjoebergi Smith, 1925 und Gonocephalus robinsonii Boulenger, 1908 ". Sauria 14 (1): 15–19. (in German).

Agamidae
Taxa named by Ulrich Manthey